Xenambulacraria is a proposed clade of animals with bilateral symmetry as an embryo, consisting of the Xenacoelomorpha (i.e., Xenoturbella and acoelomorphs) and the Ambulacraria (i.e., echinoderms and hemichordates).

If confirmed, the clade would either be the sister group to the chordates (if deuterostomes are monophyletic) or the sister group to all the other bilaterians, grouped together in Centroneuralia (with deuterostomes being paraphyletic).

Although the validity of the clade relies mostly on phylogenomics, molecular genetics studies have proposed pigment cell clusters expressing polyketide synthase (PKS) and sulfotransferase as a synapomorphy of Xenambulacraria.

Phylogeny 

Xenambulacraria has usually been recovered as a clade inside of either of two distinct phylogenies.

Basal Xenambulacraria 

The following phylogeny assumes a paraphyletic Deuterostomia, with Xenambulacraria at the base of Bilateria.

Xenambulacraria inside Deuterostomia 

The following phylogeny assumes a monophyletic Deuterostomia, with Xenambulacraria contained inside of it.

Gallery

References 

Controversial taxa
Bilaterian taxa